Local elections are most probably set to be held in Romania in September 2024. The previous Romanian local elections in 2020 were won by the National Liberal Party (PNL), even though the Social Democratic Party (PSD) came in with significantly more County Council (CJ) presidents and mayors than the national liberals. 
 
Therefore, the de facto winner of the previous Romanian local elections was the Social Democratic Party (PSD), in spite of the de jure one which was the National Liberal Party (PNL), according to popular vote and thereby overall political score.

Furthermore, the 2020 USR-PLUS Alliance (now simply legally known as USR which is short for Save Romania Union) came in third with respect to popular vote yet failed to obtain an important nationwide representation (for mayors, local and municipal councillors, and county councillors alike). In the meantime, the PNL enlarged itself at local political level nationwide with the integral absorption of ALDE during late March 2022.

Background 

The government which will organize the forthcoming Romanian local elections will very likely be the National Coalition for Romania (CNR) with a Social Democratic (PSD) Prime Minister. 

Most opinion polls to date (depicted in the tables from the sections below) show the Social Democratic Party (PSD) as either the main or overall winning party in several major cities across Romania, including, most notably, the capital, Bucharest. 

In stark contrast, several other major cities are shown to favour Save Romania Union (USR) in their public administration thus far and others the National Liberal Party (PNL). The current political trend, according to the polls, is that the Social Democratic Party (PSD) is the dominant political party in the south and east of Romania (i.e. in Muntenia, Oltenia, Dobrogea, and Western Moldavia respectively), the National Liberal Party (PNL) in the centre and north of the country (i.e. in Transylvania and Bukovina), and Save Romania Union (USR), sporadically at urban level in the south-western part of the country, more specifically in Banat.

Opinion polls

National results in 2020 

In the table below are highlighted the major electoral scores (or results) obtained by the 6 largest political parties in Romania at the previous local elections which here held in September 2020:

National polling 

In the table below are represented the prospective results of the 6 main political parties active in Romania at local political level for the forthcoming local elections which are going to be held in 2024:

Regional

Bucharest

Seats projection

Mayor of Bucharest

Sector 1 (Bucharest)

Sector 5 (Bucharest)

Cluj-Napoca

Constanța

Iași

Brașov

Timișoara

Târgu Jiu

Alba Iulia

Current political distribution of administrative mandates at local political level in Romania 

In the table below are statistically represented the vast majority of the administrative mandates won nationwide in Romania by the following 12 political parties (both major and minor) after the 2020 Romanian local elections (based on their total number of elected representatives) as well as their current political distribution of administrative mandates in Romania at local political level, according to the 4 main categories as follows (statistics correct as of late March 2023):

Notes

References 

Local election, 2024
2024 elections in Romania
2024 in Romania
Romania